Big Something is an American alternative rock band based in Burlington, North Carolina.

Big Something is known for their high-energy live performances and are a popular staple at many music festivals. They have opened for The B52s, Robert Randolph and the Family Band, Galactic, Umphrey's McGee and other bands in their genre. Big Something also hosts their own annual music festival, The Big What, in Mebane, North Carolina.

The band has released five studio albums, as well as a number of live recordings. Their first studio album, Songs From the Middle of Nowhere, won the Home Grown Music Network's 2010 Album of the Year award.

History
The band started in the Maryland area under the name "anonymous" before evolving into Big Something.
 
Big Something formed in 2009 and released their first studio album, Songs from the Middle of Nowhere, in 2010. Between studio recordings, the band released a live album Live from Uranus. The band then released their second, self-titled album in 2013. The sophomore album garnered three different Album of the Year awards from Angelica Music, Endless Boundaries radio, and the Home Grown Music Network.

The band released a third studio album, Truth Serum, in November 2014. The release was preceded by two singles, "Megalodon" and "Capt. D". In the winter of 2016, the band toured with improvisational rock band The Werks.

During this time the band gained popularity, touring throughout the United States and playing the Telluride The Ride Festival in Colorado for the first time in the summer of 2016. They also began being featured on Sirius XM Radio's Jam On station.

The band released the single "Tumbleweed" in December 2016 in anticipation for the 2017 release of their album of the same name.

Discography
Albums
2010: Stories from the Middle of Nowhere 
2013: Big Something
2014: Truth Serum
2017: Tumbleweed
2018: The Otherside 
2020: Escape
2022: Escape from the Living Room

Singles
2016: Tumbleweed 
2018: Sundown Nomad
2018: Wildfire
2020: Heavy
2020: The Breakers 
2020: Timebomb
2020: Dangerous
2021: Machines (Unplugged)

References

Alternative rock groups from North Carolina
Musical groups established in 2009